Longsnout butterflyfish or longnose butterflyfish may refer to:

 Chelmon rostratus (Banded longsnout butterflyfish)
 Forcipiger flavissimus (Yellow longnose butterflyfish)
 Forcipiger longirostris (Longnose butterflyfish)
 Prognathodes aculeatus (Caribbean longsnout butterflyfish)